The NBA G League Coach of the Year is an annual NBA G League award given since the 2006–07 season to the best head coach of the regular season. The league's head coaches determine the award by voting and it is usually presented to the honoree during the G League playoffs. The winner receives the Dennis Johnson Trophy, which is named in honor of Hall of Fame player Dennis Johnson, a star NBA guard who died in 2007 while serving as head coach of the Austin Toros, in what was then known as the NBA Development League (or D-League).

In 2015–16, Sioux Falls Skyforce head coach Dan Craig was named the recipient of Coach of the Year after guiding the Skyforce to a 40–10 regular-season record, the best mark in league history.

Winners

See also
NBA Coach of the Year Award

References

National Basketball Association lists
Coach
Awards established in 2007